9 is a 2009 computer-animated post-apocalyptic science fiction film directed by Shane Acker, written by Pamela Pettler and produced by Jim Lemley, Tim Burton, Timur Bekmambetov and Dana Ginsburg. In the film, Elijah Wood voices a small ragdoll-like robot who awakens shortly after the end of mankind, and must find eight other robots to figure out the mystery behind humanity's destruction while tangling with the vicious creations of a massive soul-stealing machine. The film also features the voices of John C. Reilly, Jennifer Connelly, Christopher Plummer and Crispin Glover, with Martin Landau and Fred Tatasciore.

The film is based on Acker's 2005 CG-animated, Academy Award-nominated short film of the same name created at the UCLA Animation Workshop. Focus Features released it theatrically on September 9, 2009. The film received generally mixed reviews from critics and earned $48.4 million on a $30 million budget. It also received an Annie Award nomination for Best Animated Effects in a Feature Production. The film was released on DVD and Blu-ray on December 29, 2009.

Plot
A scientist is ordered by his dictator to create a robot in the apparent name of progress, and so the scientist creates the B.R.A.I.N., a highly intelligent robot. The dictator seizes it upon its apparent completion and turns it into the Fabrication Machine, an armature that can construct an army of war machines to destroy the dictator's enemies. However, the B.R.A.I.N. became corrupted because it lacked a soul, causing it to exterminate humanity. On the verge of destruction, the scientist uses alchemy to create nine homunculus-like rag dolls known as "Stitchpunks" as a last resort to stopping the machines, giving them portions of his own soul via a talisman he created. He dies upon completion of the final doll.

Some time later, the final Stitchpunk, 9, awakens in the workshop and ventures into the devastated city where he meets 2, a frail inventor who gives him a working voice box. The last active machine, the Cat-Beast, attacks the pair and abducts both 2 and takes the talisman. 9 collapses, but awakens in Sanctuary, the tower of an empty cathedral that is home to other Stitchpunks - the dogmatic leader 1, his large bodyguard 8, the cycloptic engineer 5, and the mentally unstable oracle 6. 9, having seen the condemned factory where the Cat-Beast took 2, decides to rescue him. 9 and 5 venture to the factory where they find 2. The Cat-Beast attacks the trio, but are saved by 7, the only female of the Stitchpunks. 9, drawn by curiosity, connects the talisman to the derelict Fabrication Machine, reviving it, and it subsequently kills 2 by sucking out his soul. 9, 5, and 7 manage to escape the factory.

7 takes 9 and 5 to an abandoned library, where the silent scholar twins, 3 and 4, have taken residence, and show 9 the Fabrication Machine's origins. 5 realizes the talisman's symbols match the clairvoyant drawings of 6. 9 and 5 return to Sanctuary to investigate, but 1 intervenes and reprimands them for disobeying his orders. Meanwhile, the Fabrication Machine assembles new robotic creatures; one of them, the bird-like Winged Beast, attacks the Sanctuary. 7 joins the fight and Stitchpunks defeats the Winged Beast.

As the group retreats to the library, 6, 3, and 4 cryptically explain the talisman's origins, but 1 reveals to the group that he sent 2 out of Sanctuary on a scouting trip to die. 7, shocked by this, attacks 1, but flees when 9 intervenes. Meanwhile, the Fabrication Machine retrieves 2's corpse and uses it as a hypnotic lure for another one of its robot creatures, known as The Seamstress. The Seamstress attacks the library and captures both 7 and 8, but 2's body is recovered and given a funeral by the others. The others then run to the factory to destroy the machines. 9 goes in alone, kills the Seamstress, and rescues 7, but not before 8's soul is absorbed by the Fabrication Machine. 9 and 7 escape while the others destroy the factory.

The Fabrication Machine, which survived, suddenly emerges from the ruins of the factory and absorbs 5's soul. The Fabrication Machine attacks the group as they run away and manages to capture 6. 6 tells 9 to go to the Scientist's workshop to find answers, before being absorbed by the Fabrication Machine. 9 follows 6's instructions, finding a holographic recorded message from the Scientist, explaining B.R.A.I.N.'s origins and that the Stitchpunks have his soul, making them the only hope for humanity. Following this revelation, 9 uncovers the purpose of the talisman and returns to his friends.

9 reunites with the other Stitchpunks and decides to sacrifice himself so the others can retrieve the talisman. Having had a change of heart, 1 redeems himself by saving 9, pushing him out of the way and allowing himself to be absorbed while 9 removes the talisman. 9 activates the talisman and reabsorbs the souls taken by the Machine, resulting in its final destruction. Afterwards, 9, 7, 3, and 4 free the souls of 5, 1, 6, 2, and 8 from the talisman as they fly up into the sky, causing it to rain. The final image shows that the raindrops contain small flecks of glowing bacteria, bringing life back into the world.

Cast and characters

Stitchpunks
 1 (Christopher Plummer) is the fearful, arrogant portion of the Scientist's personality. He is the self-appointed leader of the group, demanding absolute loyalty from the others and frequently clashing with 9, who refuses to follow him. He is seen to be quite rude, lacking guilt for his actions when the others do not do as he is asked.
 2 (Martin Landau) is the creative and genius portion of the Scientist's personality. He is a kind, delicate old inventor. He is fascinated by garbage and scrap, and loves to explore the wastelands and look for parts for his inventions. He is the first one of the group to die.
 3 and 4 are twins, and the historians of the group and parts of the Scientist's personality. Both are unable to speak, but are capable of using flickering lights in their eyes to communicate with each other. They project images from their eyes to share information with the other Stitchpunks. They are very intelligent and energetic. They were found alongside 5 by 7 during a battle between man and machine. Their genders are never revealed. They are also two of the only members of the group to not die.
 5 (John C. Reilly) is the healer part of the Scientist's personality. 5 is caring, nurturing, and the loyal, bighearted "common man" who always tries to play the peacemaker. He is seen as the most frightened by the situation, as shown throughout the movie. He lost an eye during a battle between man and machine after 7 found him with 3 and 4. Despite being afraid of conflict, he is skilled with his weapons of choice and is seen to mend the other members of the group when they are hurt.
 6 (Crispin Glover) is the artistic portion of the Scientist's personality. He sees things that the others in the group do not see. 6's fingers are made of ink pen nibs, which he uses to draw. His eyes are disproportionate in size, possibly to represent his mental instability.
 7 (Jennifer Connelly) is the fighter part of the Scientist's personality and (possibly) the only female of the group. A rebel and a loner, she is willing to take many risks for the good of her people. She seems very attached to 3 and 4 and acts as a mother or older sister figure to them.
 8 (Fred Tatasciore) is the brutish ruffian from the Scientist's personality. He is a master of weapons and wields one half of a scissor and a knife. He is the largest of the group, but the least intelligent. He is also responsible for protecting 1 as seen in a battle with the winged metal monster.
 9 (Elijah Wood) is the youngest of the group that represents the Scientist's humanity, big-heartedness, thoughtfulness, and sincerity. He is very intelligent, but he can make mistakes due to his curiosity. He seeks the truth in the history of his creation, and wishes to know the meaning of life.

Humans
 The Scientist (Alan Oppenheimer) invented the Fabrication Machine and later the nine stitchpunks to fight against the Fabrication Machine, hoping that they would continue the spark of life. Each of his creations contains a portion of his human soul, embodying both his qualities and flaws. The Fabrication Machine only contains his intellect but no soul, which he later regrets not giving, as it led to the Machine's corruption.
 The Chancellor (Tom Kane), who is a dictator, was responsible for causing the Fabrication Machine to turn against humanity after refusing to honor the Scientist's deal during the creation of the Fabrication Machine.
 The Radio Announcer (Fred Tatasciore)
 The News Reporter (Helen Wilson)

Machines and Robotic Creatures
 The Fabrication Machine is the film's main antagonist. It was created as a highly intelligent robot by The Scientist under the orders of The Chancellor. Its old name was B.R.A.I.N. The chancellor seized it upon its apparent completion and turned it into the Fabrication Machine, to construct an army of war machines to destroy the chancellor's enemies. It became corrupted because it lacked a soul and caused it to exterminate humanity. It was the creator of The Cat-Beast, The Winged-Beast, and The Seamstress.
 The Cat-Beast is one of The Fabrication Machine's creations. It takes the appearance of a cat/lion/tiger/jaguar/leopard. It is the first robotic creature the Stichpunks confronted.
 The Winged-Beast is another one of The Fabrication Machine's creations. It takes the appearance of a bird. It is the second robotic creature the Stichpunks confronted.
 The Seamstress is the last of The Fabrication Machine's creations. It was used to lure the Stichpunks disguised as 2. It is the last robotic creature the Stichpunks confront.

Music

The film soundtrack was released only on iTunes and on Amazon nine days before the film was released. It includes the themes created by Danny Elfman, Deborah Lurie's film score, and "Welcome Home" by Coheed and Cambria. The latter song was used in two trailers for the film, with minor censoring for the full song in the soundtrack. Along with "Welcome Home", the teaser trailer also features an excerpt from "The Captain" by The Knife, which was also not included in the soundtrack. Other songs within the film that were not included in the soundtrack was the traditional "Dies Irae" chant, performed by Crispin Glover as part of the background score, and "Over the Rainbow", the song from The Wizard of Oz and performed by Judy Garland. The song plays in a lighthearted scene when the surviving stitchpunks were celebrating the destruction of the factory and played it on a 78rpm phonograph record.

Marketing
On December 25, 2008, a trailer was released on Apple.com that features The Knife's "The Captain" and Coheed and Cambria's "Welcome Home".

9 is the second animated feature film to be released by Focus Features, the first being Coraline, written and directed by Henry Selick and based on the book by Neil Gaiman. The trailer for 9 preceded Coraline when it was shown in theaters and released on DVD. A second trailer for 9 first appeared on G4's Attack of the Show and was later shown before Land of the Lost. It is an extensive trailer which includes a bit of the background story behind the existence of the creations. In April 2009, the film's "Scientist" began making journal entries on a Facebook page called "9 Scientist", including essays about each of his nine creations. The "9 Scientist" Facebook page seemingly references events leading up to the release of the film. A viral campaign promotional website for 9 was launched. It shed some light upon the background of the 9 world. The trailer featured several machines: the Cat Beast, a catlike ambush predator that appeared in the original short film; the Winged Beast, a pterodactyl-style machine with movable blades in its mouth; the Seamstress, a hypnotic serpent; Steel War Behemoths, large two-legged machines armed with a machine gun and poison gas missiles which can kill in a matter of seconds; the Fabrication Machine (previously known as B.R.A.I.N.), a cyclopean, spiderlike machine with many multi-jointed arms; and Seekers, aerial machines with searchlights. Later trailers also reveal the existence of several small spiderlike machines. Part of the film's marketing strategy was its release date of September 9, 2009 ("9/9/09").

Video game
Shortly before the film's release, Life released a mobile game adaptation entitled 9: The Mobile Game for the iPhone and iPod Touch.

Reception

Critical response
On Rotten Tomatoes, the film has an overall approval rating of 58% based on 185 reviews and average rating of 5.90/10. The website's critical consensus states: "Although its story is perhaps too familiar and less complex than some might wish, 9 is visually spectacular, and director Shane Acker's attention to detail succeeds in drawing viewers into the film's universe." On Metacritic, it holds a weighted average score of 60 out of 100 based on reviews from 31 critics, indicating "mixed or average reviews".

Roger Ebert gave the film three stars out of four, favorably comparing it to the works of Hayao Miyazaki and saying that it is "beautifully animated and intriguingly unwholesome... nevertheless worth seeing". The general sentiment by critics is that the film is "long on imaginative design but less substantial in narrative." Varietys Todd McCarthy says, "In the end, the picture's impact derives mostly from its design and assured execution."

Box office
Its opening weekend landed it at #2 behind I Can Do Bad All By Myself with approximately $10,740,446 and $15,160,926 for its five-day opening. The film has grossed US$48,428,063 worldwide.

Awards and nominations

Home media release
The film was released on DVD and Blu-ray on December 29, 2009, three-and-a-half months after the film's theatrical release. The DVD and Blu-ray contained special features such as the director Shane Acker's original 2005 short film of the same name, cast interviews, and commentary by the filmmakers.

Possible sequel

No plans for a sequel have been made, but possibilities were mentioned via the film's 2009 DVD commentary. Director Acker has also mentioned the possibility of a sequel being made because of the lack of darker animated films, claiming that everything is G- and PG-rated with little to no dark elements. In 2009 he said that he will continue to make darker animated films, either doing so with a sequel to 9 or original ideas for future films. Before the theatrical release of the film, Acker and producer Tim Burton stated they were open for a sequel, depending on how well the film was received. Since the film's home release, there have been no further mentions of a sequel, with Acker focusing on projects announced in 2011 (The Adventures of Thomas), 2012 (Deep), 2013 (Beasts of Burden) and other four projects aimed for older audiences of which have not been released , until Crusoe, a comic science fiction short film began to release 2021.

Despite the silence from Acker, in January 2017, the Facebook profile of the character "the Scientist" was updated with a rather cryptic message. The profile had been inactive since 2009, leading some to speculate the teasing of a sequel.

See also

 List of American films of 2009
 9 (2005 film) – The original short film on which 9 is based.
 Rag doll

References

External links

 
 
9 at the TCM Movie Database
 
 
 
 Shane Acker's official website - Dead Link

2009 films
2009 animated films
2009 computer-animated films
2009 directorial debut films
2009 science fiction films
2000s American animated films
2009 action thriller films
2000s fantasy adventure films
American adult animated films
American animated science fantasy films
American animated science fiction films
American dark fantasy films
American fantasy adventure films
American science fiction adventure films
American robot films
Animated thriller films
2000s English-language films
English-language Luxembourgian films
D-Box motion-enhanced films
Features based on short films
Films based on urban legends
Films produced by Tim Burton
Films scored by Deborah Lurie
Films set in Germany
Films set in Berlin
Films set in the 1940s
Films set in the 20th century
Films with screenplays by Pamela Pettler
Focus Features animated films
Focus Features films
Relativity Media animated films
Relativity Media films
Animated post-apocalyptic films
Bazelevs Company films